Convoy ON 144 was a trade convoy of merchant ships during the Second World War. It was the 144th of the numbered series of ON convoys Outbound from the British Isles to North America. The United States Coast Guard cutters Bibb, Duane, and Ingham accompanied the convoy from the Western Approaches with ships that detached for Iceland on 15 November.

Background
As western Atlantic coastal convoys brought an end to the second happy time, Admiral Karl Dönitz, the Befehlshaber der U-Boote (BdU) or commander in chief of U-Boats, shifted focus to the mid-Atlantic to avoid aircraft patrols. Although convoy routing was less predictable in the mid-ocean, Dönitz anticipated that the increased numbers of U-boats being produced would be able to effectively search for convoys with the advantage of intelligence gained through B-Dienst decryption of British Naval Cypher Number 3. However, of the 180 trans-Atlantic convoys sailing from the end of July 1942 until the end of April 1943, only 20 percent lost ships to U-boat attack.

The Norwegian-manned corvettes of escort group B-6 fought three of these convoy battles in sequential voyages with convoys SC 104, ON 144, and HX 217.

15 November

16 November
When initial attempts to summon additional U-boats to the convoy were unsuccessful, U-521 was granted permission to attack, and missed with a salvo of six torpedoes. Rose unsuccessfully counterattacked with depth charges.

17 November
,  and  found the convoy and launched a simultaneous attack after sunset. U-262 missed with three torpedoes. U-264 sank the 6,696-ton Greek freighter Mount Taurus, and U-184 sank the 3,192-ton British freighter Widestone.

18 November
U-624, U-521,  and  launched torpedoes in the pre-dawn hours.  U-624 sank the 5,344-ton British tanker President Sergent and the 4,732-ton American freighter Parismina and damaged the 5,432-ton American freighter Yaka which was later sunk by U-522. The Type 271 centimeter-wavelength radar-equipped corvettes counterattacked, and U-184 was sunk by one of those attacks. Montbretia was torpedoed by U-262 and sank while still moving forward.

19 November

Ships in convoy

See also
 Convoy Battles of World War II

Notes

References
 
 
 
 
 
 

ON144
C